Ilja Venäläinen (born 27 September 1980) is a retired Finnish football player. He played for FF Jaro and FC KooTeePee and most recently for Kuopion Palloseura (KuPS), in the Finnish Premier League.

References

Guardian Football
Veikkausliiga

Finnish footballers
Kuopion Palloseura players
FF Jaro players
Veikkausliiga players
Finland international footballers
1980 births
Living people
Association football forwards
People from Kuopio
Sportspeople from North Savo